Konstantinos Polychroniou (12 November 1936 – 1 June 2018), better known as Kostas Polychroniou, was a Greek professional football player and manager.

Career
Born in Platanistos, Euboea, Polychroniou's family moved to Athens when he was six months old. Polychroniou is considered as one-club man spending his entire career playing for the Greek giants Olympiacos F.C. making 305 appearances in Alpha Ethniki and a total of 662 caps in all competitions (also including 239 friendly games). Kostas Polychroniou capped 27 times for Greece.

He managed AEL, Rodos, Doxa Drama, Apollon Smyrni, Levadiakos, Olympiacos, Greece, Ionikos, Paniliakos.

See also
List of one-club men in association football

References

1936 births
2018 deaths
Greek footballers
Greece international footballers
Olympiacos F.C. players
Greek football managers
Athlitiki Enosi Larissa F.C. managers
Rodos F.C. managers
Doxa Drama F.C. managers
Apollon Smyrnis F.C. managers
Levadiakos F.C. managers
Olympiacos F.C. managers
Greece national football team managers
Ionikos F.C. managers
Paniliakos F.C. managers
Association football midfielders
People from Karystos
Footballers from Central Greece